The discography of Foreigner, a British-American rock band, consists of 9 studio albums, 7 live albums, 20 compilation albums, and 47 singles.

The band was formed in New York City in 1976 by veteran English musicians Mick Jones and Ian McDonald, and American vocalist Lou Gramm. Since then, Foreigner has released nine studio albums, seven of which have reached the top 30 of the Billboard 200 chart. 4 was the band's only chart-topper in the US, while Agent Provocateur was their only album to achieve the same feat on the UK Albums Chart. Overall, Foreigner's albums have sold more than 50 million copies worldwide, almost 40 million of them in the United States alone.

Among the 47 singles released by the band, 14 of them became top 20 hits in the Billboard Hot 100 chart, including the number-one song "I Want to Know What Love Is" and the number-two "Waiting for a Girl Like You", which spent a record-setting 10 weeks at the number 2 position of the chart without ever reaching the top. Four of these singles were certified Gold by the RIAA for shipments of over a million copies, all of them which peaked within the top 3 ("Hot Blooded", "Double Vision", "Waiting for a Girl Like You" and "I Want to Know What Love Is"). Despite its British roots, the band achieved only moderate success in the UK Singles Chart, with only two of their songs, "Waiting for a Girl Like You" and "I Want to Know What Love Is", peaking within the top 20.

In 2014, Rhino released a boxed set of the band's seven albums recorded for Atlantic entitled Foreigner: The Complete Atlantic Studios Albums 1977-1991. The first four albums that were expanded to include bonus tracks in 2002 were included in the set along with the remaining albums by the band. These were housed in cardboard replicas of the original vinyl sleeves.

Albums

Studio albums

Live albums

Compilation albums

Singles

References

Discography
Discographies of American artists
Rock music group discographies